Filodrillia angulifera is a species of sea snail, a marine gastropod mollusk in the family Borsoniidae.

Description

Distribution
This marine species is endemic to Australia and occurs off Western Australia.

References

 Cotton, Bernard C.: Australian Recent and Tertiary Turridae. Field Naturalists Section of the Royal Society of South Australia, Conchology Club, 1947.

angulifera
Gastropods of Australia
Gastropods described in 1947